Rangu is a 2018 action thriller Telugu-language film written and directed by Kaarthikeya Varikallu, cinematography by T. Surendra Reddy and produced by Padmanabha Reddy under U&I Entertainements Banner. It features Tanish and Priya Singh in the lead roles. The film was released worldwide on 23 November 2018.

Cast
 Tanish as PawanKumar Lara
 Paruchuri Ravindranath
 SameerDatta as Bandi seenu
 Priya Singh as Purna
 Posani Krishna Murali as Ex MLA
 Prudhvi Raj
 Shafi 
 Paruchuri Venkateswara Rao

Soundtrack
This film has four songs composed by Yogeshwara Sharma and lyrics are written by Sirivennela Seetharama Sastry and Sri Sai Kiran. Music released through Aditya Music.

Reception
The film received positive reviews from critics. 123telugu.com termed the film as "Impressive in Parts".

References

External links

2018 films
2010s Telugu-language films
Films set in Vijayawada
Films shot in Vijayawada
Films set in Andhra Pradesh
Films shot in Andhra Pradesh